Hollister is an English family name from the Gloucestershire region of England, now most numerous in the United States of America. In 1992, it was estimated there were 2204 households in the US, 94 in Canada, 81 in Australia, 21 in New Zealand, 3 in Denmark and 371 in Great Britain.

Derivation

One source suggests that the name Hollister is associated with Hollier, in the same way that Baxter is known to be a feminine form of Baker. The IGI suggests that the stronghold of the Hollister name is Wickwar in Gloucestershire, which happens also to be the stronghold of the Hallier surname, rather than Hollier.

The surname dictionaries usually reference a link between Hollister and Hollier and variously describe its meaning as relating to Old English or Old French words meaning "dweller by the holly tree" or "whoremonger". Such dictionaries rarely give any proof of such assertions and so must be considered as speculative.

Heraldry

There are two coats of arms often associated with the family name Hollister; however, it has not been shown that either have been officially linked to the name, since coats of arms are associated with individuals, not surnames. Coats of arms cannot automatically be claimed by any member of a family. The coat of arms is bestowed on an individual and is passed to the eldest child (usually son). Younger children officially have to use differencing when displaying arms.

Most often Burke's General Armoury is quoted as listing the following for the name Hollister:

Sable on a bend between a Greyhound Courant bendways in chief and a Dolphin Haurient in base argent three Torteaux, on a chief of the second three sprigs of Strawberry fructed proper.

This translates as:

A black field with a silver bend. On the bend 3 red circles. Above the bend a silver greyhound in line with the bend, and below the bend a silver dolphin erect with head upwards. At the top of the shield a silver field with 3 sprigs of strawberry with natural coloured fruit.

This is, however an erroneous link, even in terms of the surname. In fact this coat of arms is linked to the name Hollist. Commercial heraldry companies continue to link the name and the coat of arms.

Another coat of arms, a derivation of this, was published in an unknown US book. The differences include using strawberry fruit instead of the torteaux.

Distribution

To Australia

The first recorded migration of a Hollister to Australia was with the First Fleet in 1788, Job Hollister, on the Convict Transport Alexander. Hollister was sentenced in Bristol, England to 7 years of penal servitude in New South Wales, for stealing tobacco. He apparently left the colony in July 1793 for Nootka Sound, Vancouver Island.

In about 1855 Augustus Henry Hollister, of Frampton Cotterel, UK, migrated to Victoria to search for gold. Later his father, Levi Hollister, migrated to see the 3 sons who had migrated. This is the major Hollister line in Eastern Australia.

In 1866, James Hollister migrated to South Australia aboard the Prince of Wales from Somerset, England. This is the major Hollister line in South Australia

To the United States of America

Lieut. John Hollister went to America in 1642 and settled at Wethersfield, Connecticut; b. 1612; m. Joanna (d. 1694), daughter of Richard Treat, and died in April 1665. This is the major Hollister line in the USA.

To Denmark
The name in Denmark is founded by Gunnar Jensen, who changed his name in the US and returned to Denmark in 1969. In 1972 Gunnar's son Robert was the first in Denmark to have the name from birth. He and his younger brother Allan have later changed their surnames. Gunnars grandson Daniel was christent Hollister and today there are 6 people with the name in Denmark

List of notable persons with the surname

Alice Hollister, American silent film actress
Bob James, country singer born Robert James Hollister
Brett Hollister, member of New Zealand Bronze Medal-winning coxed fours at the 1984 Summer Olympics
C. Warren Hollister, historian and author of "Medieval Europe: A Short History"
 Carroll Hollister, an American classical pianist, who often accompanied Yehudi Menuhin
Cassius M. Hollister was a 19th-century American law enforcement officer
Charles M. Hollister was an American football coach
Dave Hollister, an American R&B vocalist during the 1990s, one-fourth of the R&B quartet BLACKstreet, and later a solo artist
David Hollister, a Michigan politician
Di Hollister, along with Christine Milne, first female Greens member of parliament in Australia
George K. Hollister (1873–1952), American pioneer cinematographer
Hollister brothers
Lyle Eugene Hollister, one of the three Hollister brothers, all sailors in the United States Navy during World War II, who were killed in 1943
Richard Jerome Hollister, one of the three Hollister brothers, all sailors in the United States Navy during World War II, who were killed in 1943
William Howard Hollister, one of the three Hollister brothers, all sailors in the United States Navy during World War II, who were killed in 1943
Howard Clark Hollister was a United States federal judge
John B. Hollister (7 November 1890 – 4 January 1979) was a U.S. Representative from Ohio
John J. Hollister Jr. was an agriculturalist, banker and California state senator
John W. Hollister (21 October 1869 – 8 March 1950) was an American football player and coach in the United States
Lindsay Hollister (born 1977), American actress
M. E. Hollister (1808–1896), justice of the Idaho Territorial supreme court
Nancy Putnam Hollister, a Republican politician from the U.S. state of Ohio
Ned Hollister was an American biologist
Sara Northrup was the second wife of L. Ron Hubbard, and later known as Sara Northrup Hollister (by marriage)
Valerie Hollister (born 1939), American painter, printmaker
William Welles Hollister (1818–1886), California rancher and entrepreneur

Fictional characters
 Amy Hollister, character played by Beth Wohl in the Bones episode The Knight on the Grid
 Captain Frank Hollister, Captain of the Red Dwarf, Red Dwarf sci-fi television series
 Captain James "Cap" Hollister, director of a secret US government agency called The Shop in the Stephen King novel Firestarter
Ethel Hollister, a character in the Campfire Girls novels
 Clay Hollister, sheriff of Tombstone, Arizona (played by Pat Conway) in the TV series Tombstone Territory
The Happy Hollisters, children's mystery book family
 Hayley Wilson Hollister, character played by Dana Delany in As the World Turns
 Jack Hollister a.k.a. Skysurfer One, animated character in Skysurfer Strike Force
 John M. Hollister, fictional character who was claimed to have founded Hollister Co. in 1922 as a pacific merchant shop.
Judge Yvonne Hollister, a Judge in the Judge Dredd series
 Juliet Hollister, founder of the Temple of Understanding
 Lily Hollister, a Marvel Comics character better known as the villain Menace
 Lynn Hollister, a character played by John Wayne in the movie A Man Betrayed
 Major Mad Dog Hollister, a character played by Bill Bailey, in the movie Water
 Maxwell Hollister, character in The Young and the Restless, played by Sam Behrens
 Park Ranger Hollister, character played by Steve Inwood in Grizzly II: The Predator

References

External links
"About The Hollyer, Holyer and Hollier Names"